The 1998 World Weightlifting Championships were held in Lahti, Finland from November 7 to November 15. The men's competition in the middleweight (77 kg) division was staged on 12 November 1998.

Medalists

Records

Results

New records

References
Results
Weightlifting World Championships Seniors Statistics, Page 16 

1998 World Weightlifting Championships